Léo Bureau-Blouin (born December 17, 1991) is a former Quebec politician who in the 2012 provincial election at age 20 became the youngest person ever to be elected as a member of the National Assembly of Quebec. He was elected in the district of Laval-des-Rapides for the Parti Québécois. He was previously a student leader, president of the Fédération étudiante collégiale du Québec, who played a key role in organizing the 2012 Quebec student protests. He lost his seat in the 2014 general election on April 7 to the Quebec Liberal Party candidate Saul Polo.

Bureau-Blouin was born in Montreal and grew up in Saint-Hyacinthe. At the time of the 2012 election he was enrolled as a law student at the Université de Montréal.

See also
Université Laval

References 

1991 births
Canadian Rhodes Scholars
Living people
Parti Québécois MNAs
Politicians from Laval, Quebec
People from Saint-Hyacinthe
Politicians from Montreal
21st-century Canadian politicians